An unavailable funds fee is a penalty fee applied by a bank on a transaction account when a transaction is posted to an account that has negative available balance even though it has a positive physical balance.  The fee is distinct from a non-sufficient funds fee as there is a positive physical balance but some or all the funds are on hold meaning that the balance is not yet available.

Bank fees such as the unavailable funds fee are contentious and have been the subject of some debate.  Consumer advocacy groups have criticised them as opaque and unfair and that they particularly penalise the poor and fees do not reflect the banks' costs.   The banks argue that it is a penalty not a transaction fee. These fees have become a major source of income for banks, replacing the traditional account and transaction fees which in many countries have disappeared.

Overview
The "unavailable funds" fee, not to be confused with the "non-sufficient funds" (NSF), "overdraft", "exceed hold" or "overlimit" fees, is a fee that results from a transaction that posts to a negative available balance and a positive physical balance, as applied to a Demand Deposit Account; usually a checking account.  The fee is typically applied at the end of the business day, as most banks process transactions at the end of each business day.

An account has two distinct balances: a posted balance (or physical balance) and an account balance.  The difference comes from transactions that have been applied to the account but have holds against them.  To understand how an "unavailable funds fee" comes about it is important to understand the difference between the two types of balances.

Posted Balance
The "posted balance" is money that physically is in the account. This balance is the result of a transaction that has a date in the past. This is the actual or the "real balance" of the money in the account.

Available Balance
The "available balance" is the "posted balance" minus the total of the "holds" that have today's date or a date in the future.

For example, if a newly opened bank account contains $100 with $20 on hold, the available balance will be $80.

Holds
A "hold" is money that the bank has either chosen or is not allowed to make available to the customer yet. "Holds" originate from cheque deposits waiting to clear, notice of returns, notice of collection, debit card purchases or direct deposit.  A "hold" is assigned a dollar value and a time frame, typically between 1 and 14 days.  Holds are not permanent and once the reason for the hold has been resolved, it either becomes a posted transaction or the payment is reversed. At this point, when a transaction posts a fee can be generated.

To illustrate this, the following example shows a number of transactions and the hold balance over a period of 7 days, starting the 1 Jan 2006 until 7 Jan 2006.

Example
The following bank statement shows a customer that has over spent by one penny and as a result has generated five fees.  The overspending fee used in the example is $30.00 which is typical for the banks that charge this type of fee.  These fees occur when a transaction post to the account and the available balance is negative.  In this example there is 5 purchases ($10.00 for gas, $35.01 for net, $15.00 for phone, $15.00 for music and $25.00 for food, total =$100.01) and a standard deposit hold period.

Governance

United States
Not all overspending fees are officially defined or regulated in the United States.  It is up to the individual bank to decide if the Unavailable Funds Fee should be applied, instead it could dishonour the payment to avoid a customer getting into a position where the fee applies.

See also
Bank charge
Non-sufficient funds
Overdraft
Overdraft protection
Deposit account
Debit card

References

External links
 Credit Unions, National Credit Union Administration
 Savings Associations
 Office of Thrift Supervision
 Federal Reserve Consumer Help

Banking terms